Ioannis Mitroulas (born 19 March 1974) is a Greek cross-country skier. He competed in the men's 10 kilometre classical event at the 1992 Winter Olympics.

References

External links
 

1974 births
Living people
Greek male cross-country skiers
Olympic cross-country skiers of Greece
Cross-country skiers at the 1992 Winter Olympics
Sportspeople from Veria